Hosta laevigata is a species  plants that belong to the family Asparagaceae.

Description
The flowers have long lobes and are deep violet.

Distribution
This species is native to some small islands off the southwestern coast of Korea.

References
The Hosta Library
Biolib
Gwannon

laevigata